Arman Taranis (born 30 July 2001) is a Danish footballer of Bosnian descent, who plays as a forward for Danish club Ringkøbing IF.

Club career

SønderjyskE
Taranis started playing at Felding Gymnastik og Idrætsforening (SFGIF). After a spells at Herning Fremad and at FC Midtjylland which he joined as a U14 player, Taranis moved to SønderjyskE in the summer 2017 as a U17 player. On 31 March 2017, 15-year old Taranis signed his first three-year youth contract with SønderjyskE.

Taranis got his official debut for SønderjyskE on 5 September 2019, when he played 49 minutes against BK Viktoria in the Danish Cup. His debut in the Danish Superliga came on 8 July 2020 against Lyngby BK. On the following day, he was permanently promoted to the first team squad, signing a new professional deal with SønderjyskE for the rest of 2020. However, on the last day of the 2020-21 summer transfer market, Taranis' contract was terminated by mutual consent.

Burnley
After leaving SønderjyskE, Taranis began training with Tjørring IF, where he uncle also was playing. However, as a free agent, Taranis got contacted by Burnley after being spotted during a game for the Danish U19 national team against Ireland and after a short trial spell, where he also played a friendly game against Preston North End, he signed a deal until the summer 2022 on 20 November 2020 and was registered for the U23 team.

In March, Taranis landed unlucky and broke the collarbone during a training session, keeping him out for the rest of the season. In May 2021 it was announced that Taranis would be leaving the club a year before his contract expired.

Ringkøbing IF
On 1 October 2021, Taranis returned to Denmark, signing with Denmark Series club Ringkøbing IF. He made his debut the following day, coming on as a substitute in a 2–1 away victory against Kjellerup IF.

International career
In October 2019, Taranis was called up for the Danish U-19 national team. He played the two friendly games against Ireland U19 in October, scoring two goals in the last of the two games, and also played two games in the 2020 UEFA European Under-19 Championship qualification in November 2019.

References

External links
 
 

2001 births
Living people
Danish men's footballers
Danish expatriate men's footballers
Danish people of Bosnia and Herzegovina descent
Denmark youth international footballers
Association football forwards
Danish Superliga players
Denmark Series players
FC Midtjylland players
SønderjyskE Fodbold players
Burnley F.C. players
Ringkøbing IF players
Danish expatriate sportspeople in England
Expatriate footballers in England
People from Herning Municipality
Sportspeople from the Central Denmark Region